Armnews TV (Armenian: Արմնյուզ հեռուստատեսություն) was a private television broadcasting company in Armenia. Armnews TV along with ATV and Armenia TV was part of PanArmenian Media. The owner of the channel was Hrachya Keshishyan from 2015 until the channel's closing.

On 10 February 2022, the channel was shut down after it was unable to renew its license.

References

External links
 

Television stations in Armenia
Armenian-language television stations
Television channels and stations established in 2001
Television networks in Armenia